Anaika Soti is an Indian actress and model. She appears mostly in Tamil films and in a few Telugu and Hindi films.

Career
Director Ram Gopal Varma met her on an elevator and found her to be attractive and appealing and asked her to star in his movies, which she was not interested in much. Still RGV convinced and offered her a role in one of his future ventures. She was subsequently signed on to appear in his bilingual crime film, Satya 2 (2013), shot in Hindi and Telugu, based on the Mumbai underworld.

Her second release was Vasanthabalan's Tamil period fiction film Kaaviya Thalaivan starring alongside Siddharth, Prithviraj and Vedhika. She was signed for the film while working on Satya 2, and subsequently shot for the film in rural Tamil Nadu, revealing she worked on acting like a princess to get into character. Both, the film and her portrayal of a Zamindar's daughter, won positive reviews upon release. She subsequently teamed up with Ram Gopal Varma again for a Telugu venture titled 365 Days, noting that it was her most involving role till date.

Filmography

References

External links
 
 

Living people
Actresses in Hindi cinema
Actresses in Tamil cinema
Indian film actresses
Actresses from Lucknow
21st-century Indian actresses
Actresses in Telugu cinema
1991 births